R.F.D.S. is an Australian drama TV series produced by Crawford Productions which was a spin-off of the long running series The Flying Doctors. It revolves around the everyday lifesaving efforts of the Royal Flying Doctor Service. The series ran for one season on the Nine Network from 1992 to 1993 and screened internationally.

The three-part miniseries The Flying Doctors, set in the fictional Coopers Crossing, screened in 1985 with the continuing series running from 1986 to 1991 for 221 episodes. The ratings were in decline and few original characters remained in the cast so the show was revamped.

In 1993, this spin-off series R.F.D.S. was created. The setting was changed to the real life location of Broken Hill, New South Wales and of the cast only original cast members Maurie Fields and Val Jellay. The storyline involved their characters, formerly publicans at the Coopers Crossing pub, moving to Broken Hill. The only other character retained from the original show was Penny Wellings, played by Sophie Lee. The series lasted just one season in this new incarnation.

Australian pay-TV channel FOX Classics secured the rights to the program from 3 July 2006.

Cast
 Steve Jacobs as Dr. Jim Solomon
 Lewis Fitz-Gerald as Dr. Sebert Blitho
 Elaine Smith as Dr. Sissy Wetherall
 Peter Phelps as Sr. Dennis Taylor
 Belinda Davey as Laura Regan
 Maurie Fields as Vic Buckley
 Val Jellay as Nancy Buckley
 Simone Buchanan as Rebecca Owens
 Lydia Miller as Leanne Cassidy
 Kevin J. Wilson as Ted Eastman
 Sophie Lee as Penny Wellings
 Justin Connor as Rollerblades
 Simon Grey as Jesse Solomon
 Marieke Hardy as Zoe Solomon

See also
 The Flying Doctors
 RFDS
 List of Australian television series
 List of Nine Network programs

References

External links
 
 
 

Nine Network original programming
1992 Australian television series debuts
1993 Australian television series endings
1990s Australian television miniseries
1990s Australian television series
Australian medical television series
Australian drama television series
Aviation television series
Television shows set in New South Wales
Television series by Crawford Productions
English-language television shows
Royal Flying Doctor Service of Australia